Jeronim Ljubibratić or Jeftimije Ljubibratić von Trebinje (1716 – 1 November 1779), known as Jero or Jefto, was a Ragusan military officer who served the Habsburg monarchy.

Life

Early life
Ljubibratić hailed from Trebinje, from a long line of Serbian nobility, at the time part of the Ottoman Empire (modern Bosnia and Herzegovina). His clan, the Ljubibratići, claim descent from the medieval Ljubibratić noble family.

Military career
In 1730, at the age of 14, he entered as a cadet in the regiment of Grenzers, an elite regiment of Hussars. In 1753 he ascended to the degree of oberstlieutenant. In 1758 he is an Oberst, in charge of 8° regiment of Grenz, with several military campaign successes under his belt. He had already received the title of Freiherrnstand-Baron in 1760. Then, in 1762, he is awarded the Maria-Theresa order. In 1770 is promoted to General-Major and finally in 1773, to Feldmarschall-Lieutenant (field marshal-lieutenant). He died in Vienna.

See also
 List of notable Ragusans

References

1716 births
1779 deaths
People from the Republic of Ragusa
People from Dubrovnik
18th-century Austrian people
18th-century Serbian people
Austrian military personnel
Serbian soldiers
Serbs of Bosnia and Herzegovina
Serbs of Croatia
People from Trebinje
Habsburg Serbs